Two entities are in causal contact if there may be an event that has affected both in a causal way.  Every object of mass in space, for instance, exerts a field force on all other objects of mass, according to Newton's law of universal gravitation. Because this force exerted by one object affects the motion of the other, it can be said that these two objects are in causal contact.

The only objects not in causal contact are those for which there is no event in the history of the universe that could have sent a beam of light to both.  For example, if the universe were not expanding and had existed for 10 billion years, anything more than 20 billion light-years away from the earth would not be in causal contact with it.  Anything less than 20 billion light-years away would because an event occurring 10 billion years in the past that was 10 billion light-years away from both the earth and the object under question could have affected both. 

A good illustration of this principle is the light cone, which is constructed as follows.

Given an event , the light cone classifies all events in spacetime into 5 distinct categories:

See the causal structure of Minkowski spacetime for a more detailed discussion.

Mechanics
Theoretical physics